The Eagle Pass–Piedras Negras International Bridge is an international bridge which crosses the Rio Grande connecting the United States-Mexico border cities of Eagle Pass, Texas and Piedras Negras, Coahuila. The bridge is also known as "Eagle Pass Bridge 1" and "Puente Piedras Negras-Eagle Pass". The road continues into Eagle Pass as U.S. Route 57, and Piedras Negras as Mexican Federal Highway 57.

Description
The American side of the Eagle Pass–Piedras Negras International Bridge is currently owned by the Port of Eagle Pass, which also manages it. The bridge was originally constructed in 1927 and reconstructed in 1954, after the original bridge was destroyed by a flood, the bridge was reinforced in 1985.

Border crossing

The Eagle Pass Port of Entry was established around 1896.  The first carriage bridge connecting Eagle Pass, Texas with Piedras Negras, Mexico (then known as Porfirio Díaz) was built in April 1890, but was destroyed in a flood in September 1890.  The bridge was soon replaced by the Eagle Pass–Piedras Negras International Bridge, and was again rebuilt in 1927 and 1954.

The original port facility was rebuilt in 1927 and was replaced by the current facility in 1960.

References

International bridges in Texas
International bridges in Coahuila
Toll bridges in Texas
Bridges completed in 1927
Buildings and structures in Maverick County, Texas
Transportation in Maverick County, Texas
Road bridges in Texas
Toll bridges in Mexico